Hotkovo is a village in the municipality of Novi Pazar, Serbia. Population consists entirely of two families: Malićević and Suljović.

Populated places in Raška District
Novi Pazar